Andrew Harry McKim (born July 6, 1970) is a Canadian former ice hockey centre. He played in the National Hockey League for the Boston Bruins and the Detroit Red Wings, playing a total of 38 regular season games.

Career 
McKim's lone NHL goal occurred when he was playing for Boston. It came in the Bruins' 9-4 victory over the Hartford Whalers on December 26, 1992. He won the scoring title at the 1995 Men's World Ice Hockey Championships and won the bronze medal with Team Canada.

McKim spent three seasons in Germany's Deutsche Eishockey Liga for the Eisbären Berlin and two seasons in Switzerland's Nationalliga A for the Kloten Flyers and the ZSC Lions before retiring in 2001. He is now the technical director of Paradise Minor Hockey Blades And coach of the junior warriors in Newfoundland and Labrador. He also runs and helps coach the Xtreme Hockey School in the same province.

Personal life 
McKim lives in St. John's, Newfoundland and Labrador, with his wife Anne McKim and four children.

Career statistics

Regular season and playoffs

International

External links

1970 births
Adirondack Red Wings players
Boston Bruins players
Canadian ice hockey centres
Detroit Red Wings players
Eisbären Berlin players
Genève-Servette HC players
Hull Olympiques players
Ice hockey people from New Brunswick
EHC Kloten players
Living people
Sportspeople from Saint John, New Brunswick
Providence Bruins players
St. John's Maple Leafs players
Salt Lake Golden Eagles (IHL) players
Undrafted National Hockey League players
Verdun Junior Canadiens players
ZSC Lions players
Canadian expatriate ice hockey players in Germany
Canadian expatriate ice hockey players in Switzerland
Canadian expatriate ice hockey players in the United States